Mallow with lamb is a dish from the Aegean coast and Aegean Sea islands among both Turkish and Greek people.

See also
 List of lamb dishes

References

Turkish cuisine
Cretan cuisine
Lamb dishes